Baegambong (백암봉) is a mountain of Jeollabuk-do, western South Korea. It has an elevation of 1,503 metres.

See also
List of mountains of Korea

References

Mountains of North Jeolla Province
Muju County
Geochang County